The 1928 United States presidential election in Arizona took place on November 6, 1928, as part of the 1928 United States presidential election. State voters chose three representatives, or electors, to the Electoral College, who voted for president and vice president.

Arizona was won by U.S. Secretary of Commerce Herbert Hoover (R–California), running with U.S. Senator from Kansas Charles Curtis, with 57.57% of the popular vote, against Governor of New York Al Smith (D–New York), running with U.S. Senator from Arkansas Joseph Taylor Robinson, with 42.23% of the popular vote.

Hoover would be the final Republican presidential candidate to win Arizona, or to even carry a single county in the state, until Dwight D. Eisenhower in 1952.

Results

Results by county

References

Arizona
1928
1928 Arizona elections